Oxborough is a village and civil parish in the English county of Norfolk, well known for its church and manor house Oxburgh Hall. For the purposes of local government, it falls within the district of Breckland.

The villages name means 'Ox fortification’.

The Oxborough dirk, a Bronze Age ceremonial oversize dagger was discovered nearby in 1988. It was acquired for the nation and is now on display in the British Museum.

Churches
St John's Church, in the centre of the village, is partially ruined. Its Bedingfeld Chapel of 1496 contains two rare terracotta tombs, unique in England, which commemorate members of the Bedingfeld family of Oxburgh Hall. In 1948, the tower and spire of the church collapsed onto the church below in high winds, destroying the south side of the nave. The surviving chancel and Bedingfeld chapel were subsequently repaired to become the main church buildings, leaving the destroyed nave as a grassed area.

At the Reformation, the Bedingfeld family retained their Roman Catholic faith as recusants; the Hall contains a priest hole. Following the Catholic emancipation, a new Roman Catholic chapel dedicated to St Margaret and Our Lady, was built in the grounds of Oxburgh Hall. It contains a large triptych altarpiece constructed of 16th-century panels from Antwerp.

Remains of an earlier Norman church, St. Mary Magdalene, also survive within the grounds of the Old Rectory at Oxborough Hythe, a hamlet south west of the main village.

Oxburgh Hall

Oxburgh Hall is the ancient ancestral home of the Bedingfeld family, and is now owned by the National Trust.

References

http://kepn.nottingham.ac.uk/map/place/Norfolk/Oxborough

External links

Villages in Norfolk
Civil parishes in Norfolk
Breckland District